"Touch" is a soft ballad written by Pamela Sawyer and Frank Wilson, who also produced it as a single for Motown recording group The Supremes, who issued it as a single in 1971.

It was the title track of the group's fourteenth studio album of the same name. It was the first single in which sole original Supremes member Mary Wilson had a lead vocal on a released Supremes single. Cindy Birdsong also sings lead toward the end of the song.

The single, upon release, peaked at number 71 on the Billboard Hot 100 becoming the first post-Diana Ross Supremes song to miss the Top 40. It was also the last single in which Frank Wilson would serve as producer.

This single would later be covered two years later by The Jackson 5 as the b-side to their single "Hallelujah Day", with almost no changes to the lyrics, lead singer Michael Jackson was only fourteen at the time he recorded the song for the Skywriter album. Fellow Motown group The Originals also cut a version for their 1975 album Communique.

Critical reception
Cashbox published 'Title track from group's latest LP presents an electrifying ballad surrounded by an outstanding musical showcase and all ready for its climb to the top of the r&b and pop charts. Song is the kind that will be recorded by many other artists in the future.'

Personnel

The Supremes version
Lead and background vocals by Jean Terrell, Mary Wilson, and Cindy Birdsong
Additional background vocals by The Blackberries
Produced by Frank Wilson
Instrumentation by The Funk Brothers

Jackson 5 version
Lead vocals by Michael Jackson and Jermaine Jackson
Background vocals by Jackie Jackson, Tito Jackson and Marlon Jackson
Produced by Hal Davis
Instrumentation by various Los Angeles session musicians

Charts

The Supremes version

References

1971 songs
1971 singles
The Supremes songs
The Jackson 5 songs
Songs written by Pam Sawyer
Songs written by Frank Wilson (musician)
Song recordings produced by Frank Wilson (musician)
Motown singles